Hatfield is a village in the Hatfield and Newhampton civil parish of Herefordshire, England.

Nearby settlements include the village of Bockleton, and the towns of Tenbury Wells, Bromyard and Leominster. The Herefordshire Trail runs through the village.

St Leonard's, the local church, is one of the oldest in Herefordshire; a church here was recorded in the Domesday Book of 1086. St Leonard's includes 13th and 14th-century bells and a late Saxon tub font. There is also a blocked late Saxon north doorway.

There is a caravan site in the village.

References

External links

Villages in Herefordshire